Estadio Comandante Andrés Guacurarí or Estadio Andrés Guacurarí is a multi-use stadium in Garupá, Argentina.  It is primarily used for football and is currently the home ground for Crucero del Norte.  The stadium holds 15,000 spectators and was built in 2003.

References

Comandante Andres Guacurari
Sports venues completed in 2003
Sports venues in Misiones Province
2003 establishments in Argentina